K-8 was a  of the Soviet Northern Fleet that sank in the Bay of Biscay with her nuclear weapons on board on April 12, 1970. A fire on April 8 had disabled the submarine and it was being towed in rough seas. Fifty-two crewmen were killed attempting the salvage of the boat when it sank.

Accidents

1960 loss of coolant
On 13 October 1960, while operating in the Barents Sea, K-8 suffered a ruptured steam generator tube, causing a loss-of-coolant accident. While the crew jury-rigged a system to supply emergency cooling water to the reactor, preventing a reactor core meltdown, large amounts of radioactive gas leaked out which contaminated the entire vessel. The gas radiation levels could not be determined because instrumentation could not measure such large scales. Three of the crew suffered visible radiation injuries, and many crewmen were exposed to doses of up to 1.8–2 Sv (180–200 rem).

1970 Bay of Biscay fire
During the large-scale "Ocean-70" naval exercise, K-8 suffered fires in two compartments simultaneously on 8 April 1970. Both nuclear reactors were shut down.

The captain ordered his entire crew to abandon ship but was countermanded once a towing vessel arrived. Fifty-two crewmen, including the commander, Captain 2nd Rank Vsevolod Bessonov, re-boarded the surfaced submarine that was to be towed. This was the first loss of a Soviet nuclear-powered submarine, which sank in rough seas as it was being towed in the Bay of Biscay of the North Atlantic Ocean. Eight sailors had already died due to certain compartments being locked to prevent further flooding as well as the spread of the fire as soon as it was detected. All hands on board died due to carbon monoxide poisoning and the flooding of the surfaced submarine during 80 hours of damage control in stormy conditions. Seventy-three crewmen survived.

See also
 List of military nuclear accidents
 List of sunken nuclear submarines

References

 The Bellona Foundation (http://bellona.no)

Further reading
 

1959 ships
1970 in the Soviet Union
Cold War submarines of the Soviet Union
Lost submarines of the Soviet Union
Maritime incidents in 1960
Maritime incidents in 1970
Maritime incidents in Spain
Maritime incidents in the Soviet Union
November-class submarines
Nuclear submarines of the Soviet Navy
Ships built in the Soviet Union
Shipwrecks in the Bay of Biscay
Soviet submarine accidents
Sunken nuclear submarines